Joseph Schmidt (1904–1942) was an Austro-Hungarian tenor and actor.

Joseph, Josef or Joe Schmidt may also refer to:

Joe Schmidt (American football) (born 1932), American football player and coach
Joe Schmidt (soccer) (born 1998), American soccer player
Joe Schmidt (rugby union) (Josef Schmidt, born 1965), New Zealand rugby union coach
Joe Schmidt (ice hockey) (1926–2000), Canadian ice hockey player
Josef Schmidt (general) (1893–1943), German army general
Josef Schmidt (wrestler), Austrian Olympic wrestler
Josef Friedrich Schmidt (1871–1948), German board game inventor
Joseph Hermann Schmidt (1804–1852), professor of obstetrics

See also
Józef Szmidt (born 1935), Polish athlete and former triple jump world record holder
Joseph Schmid (1901–1956), German air force general
Joseph Schmidt Confections, a chocolatier based in San Francisco, USA
Josef Schmid (disambiguation)